Game of Crowns is an American reality documentary television series on Bravo that premiered on July 13, 2014. Announced in July 2013, the show follows six women who are involved in the beauty pageant business. The series concluded on September 11, 2014.

Premise 
The reality television series features six wives who have won state contests in the Mrs. America contest or otherwise been involved in various beauty pageants around the country. The docu-series follows the daily life of the women and their families, mostly focussing on how they prepare for the pageants, including them "obsessing over the perfect swimsuit, working tirelessly with trainers and honing their interview skills with coaches – all while being dedicated mothers and wives."

Cast 

 Shelley Carbone has won the title of Mrs. Connecticut 2010 before going on to compete for the title of Mrs. America 2011. She lives in Wethersfield, Connecticut with her husband and their four children. Shelley is a registered nurse, although her full-time job is being a mother. Shelley got into pageant world as her mother secretly registered Shelley to compete in her first pageant.
 Lynne Diamante holds a title of Mrs. Rhode Island 2013 and also competed for the 2013 Mrs. America Pageant. Lynne is attorney as well as the CEO and founder of OPTX Rhode Island, luxury eyeglasses and sunglasses retailer. She also occasionally consults for celebrity clientele and industry elite. Traveling is the biggest Lynne's passion, especially with her husband and daughter around.
 Leha Guilmette is Mrs. Rhode Island 2013 and has competed in Mrs. America Pageant. She lives in Cranston in Rhode Island with her husband, a police officer, and their two children. Besides family being her main prioriority, Leha has a full-time job as an account manager and recruiter working with several Fortune 500 companies.
 Lori-Ann Marchese is a professional trainer and fitness consultant as well as a fitness cover model residing in Berlin, Connecticut. She owns a fitness facility called Body Construct LLC and has a line of Body Construct Nutrition Supplements. Lori-Ann was crowned as Mrs. Connecticut in 2013 and has recently competed in various fitness pageants.
 Susanna Paliotta is a successful business woman residing in Johnston, Rhode Island. She ows Bound by The Crown Couture, a clothing brand for children. Susanna is married, has two children. She also has a pilot’s license and wrote a children's book Isabella Goes to the City.
 Vanassa Sebastian was crowned Mrs. Connecticut 2012 and compete at Mrs. America, where she finished in the top ten. Residing in Ledyard, Connecticut, Vanassa is married to a successful businessman who, along with his family, owns one of the world's largest casinos, Foxwoods Resort & Casino.

Episodes

Reception 
Mark Perigard  from Boston Herald was very critical towards the show for its negativity. Giving the show a D, he added that the "women go on the defensive in the most vile way, alleging abuse and death threats, the sort of smears that could wreck a police officer’s career," and raising a question whether "repeated Botox use lead to brain damage." Amy Kuperinsky from The Star-Ledger gave the show a B and compared it to another reality series aired on the same network, The Real Housewives of New Jersey, also adding that a viewer would "find the same kind of conflicts — your standard-issue threats, kerfuffles over the trivial, and a healthy dose of regional accents."

References

External links 

 
 
 

2010s American reality television series
2014 American television series debuts
2014 American television series endings
English-language television shows
Bravo (American TV network) original programming
Television series about beauty pageants
Mrs. World